Rosa María Leal Flores de Pérez (b. 9 December 1953) is a Guatemalan psychologist. She is married to Otto Pérez Molina, former President of Guatemala, thus making her the First Lady of the Republic of Guatemala from 14 January 2012 to 3 September 2015.

She was a kindergarten teacher for a period of four years, from 1975 to 1979, is a technician in psychometrics and school orientation, and has a degree in clinical psychology from the Rafael Landívar University. From 1980 to 1995, Leal was Director of the National Primary Education, specializing in nursery school.

Biography
Rosa Leal de Pérez was born in Guatemala City, the eponymous capital city of Guatemala, on 9 December 1953. She would study in Guatemala City as well, enrolling at the Universidad de San Carlos de Guatemala to study for a degree in psychology. At 17, she married future President of Guatemala and General Otto Pérez Molina. For the decade after her husband and Roxana Baldetti founded the Guatemalan Patriotic Party, Leal worked for the party's affairs.

Citations

Living people
1953 births
First ladies of Guatemala
Guatemalan psychologists
People from Guatemala City
Guatemalan women psychologists